DataONE is a network of interoperable data repositories facilitating data sharing, data discovery, and open science.  Originally supported by $21.2 million in funding from the US National Science Foundation as one of the initial DataNet programs in 2009, funding was renewed in 2014 through 2020 with an additional $15 million.
DataONE helps preserve, access, use, and reuse of multi-discipline scientific data through the construction of primary cyberinfrastructure and an education and outreach program. 
DataONE provides scientific data archiving for ecological and environmental data produced by scientists. DataONE's goal is to preserve and provide access to multi-scale, multi-discipline, and multi-national data. Users include scientists, ecosystem managers, policy makers, students, educators, librarians, and the public.

DataONE links together existing cyberinfrastructure to provide a distributed framework, management, and technologies that enable long-term preservation of multi-scale, multi-discipline, and multi-national observational data. The distributed framework is composed of Coordinating Nodes located at the Oak Ridge Campus at Tennessee, University of California Santa Barbara, and University of New Mexico, and member nodes.  DataONE also provides resources including tools for accessing and using it.

Coordinating nodes
The three coordinating nodes provide network-wide services to member nodes.  They are geographically replicated, with mirrored content and full copies of science metadata.  
William Michener of the University of New Mexico (UNM) directed the project, and UNM is one of the coordinating nodes.
Coordinating nodes are UNM, Oak Ridge Campus (partnership of Oak Ridge National Laboratory (ORNL) and University of Tennessee), and the  University of California, Santa Barbara.

Member nodes
Member nodes consist of Earth observing institutions, projects, and networks. They provide resources for their own data and replicated data, and focus on serving their specific constituencies.  These member nodes are geographically distributed and include:
 Cornell Lab of Ornithology eBird
 Dryad
 Earth Data Analysis Center (EDAC)
 Environmental Data for the Oak Ridge Area (EDORA)
 Ecological Society of America (ESA) Data Registry
 Europe Long-Term Ecosystem Research Network (LTER Europe)
 Global Lake Ecological Observatory Network (GLEON)
 Gulf of Alaska Data Portal
 International Arctic Research Center (IARC) Data Archive
 Knowledge Network for Biocomplexity
 Long Term Ecological Research Network (LTER)
 Merritt Repository
 Minnesota Population Center (MPC)
 Montana IoE Data Repository
 Nevada Research Data Center
 New Mexico Experimental Program to Stimulate Competitive Research (NM EPSCoR)
 NOAA National Centers for Environmental Information (NCEI) Oceanographic Data Archive
 ONEShare Repository
 ORNL Distributed Active Archive Center
 Partnership for Interdisciplinary Studies of Coastal Oceans (PISCO)
 Program for Research on Biodiversity (PPPBio)
 Regional and Global Biogeochemical Dynamics Data (RGD)
 SANParks Data Repository
 SEAD Virtual Archive
 Taiwan Forestry Research Institute
 Terrestrial Ecosystem Research Network (TERN)
 University of Kansas - Biodiversity Institute
 USA National Phenology Network
 USGS Science Data Catalog (SDC)

Investigator Tool Kit
The Tool Kit provides tools for researchers to access DataONE.  These are both general purpose and discipline-specific tools, and developers adapt existing tools where possible. The tool kit includes Java and Python libraries, an R programming language plug-in for analysis, extensions for Excel, the VisTrails scientific workflow, and the Kepler scientific workflow system.

Data management
DataONE provides a place for scientists to store data and its associated metadata.  The metadata makes this data searchable and accessible to other scientists.  Data management practices include 
 Data management planning
 Data acquisition (techniques, protocols, methods)
 Data protection (backing up)
 Data entry and manipulation (naming files, organization) Matlab, R
 Quality control on data
 Data analysis
 Workflow tools (VisTrails, Kepler scientific workflow system)
 Data documentation (metadata)
 Data sharing, citation, and discovery
 Data preservation and curation

Some of the additional data management planning resources include: a primer for best practices, a database for best practices in data management, educational modules and tutorials, webinars, and an investigator toolkit.
These have been used or adapted for use under Creative Commons license by organizations and institutions that seek to educate other communities about data and research management. Understanding different audiences of users led to the development of possible user personas as models for users such as early-career researchers, science data librarians, citizen scientists or K-12 educators.

Collaborations

DataONE collaborates with other institutions to bring together tools that help with data management practices. One of those tools, developed in collaboration with other organizations and hosted by the University of California Digital Curation Center, is the DMPTool for data management planning. The DMP Tool is used by and referenced by many research data management plans and institutions in the US and around the world. Another recent collaboration in this area is the shared construction of a Data Management Training Clearinghouse for Earth sciences, in partnership with USGS and the Community for Data Integration (CDI).

Community
The DataONE community includes research networks, professional societies, libraries, academic institutions, data centers, data repositories, environmental observatory networks, educators, scientists, policy makers, administrators, citizen scientists, international organizations, NGOs, ecosystem managers, students, private companies and the public.
DataONE has a users group that meets yearly to provide feedback.

References

External links
 Nature.com
 Nsf.gov

National Science Foundation
Ecological databases
Biological databases
Ecological data